The Associated Students of Pomona College, commonly abbreviated as ASPC, is the student government of Pomona College, an elite liberal arts college in Claremont, California, United States. It was founded in 1904, and is composed of elected representatives. Its primary functions are distributing extracurricular funds, conducting advocacy, running student programming, and providing various student services.

History
ASPC was founded in 1904, six years after instruction began at Pomona.

Its first female president took office during World War II.

A wave election took place in 2014, in which a series of candidates ran successfully on a platform, dubbed #slate, centered around diversity, representation, and inclusivity issues.

In the 2020s, ASPC or its senators have received media attention on several occasions for instances of perceived antisemitism.

Structure

The governing body of ASPC is the ASPC Senate, which consists of roughly two dozen elected representatives, including the four class presidents and commissioners for areas such sports and environmental affairs.

Senators are paid a stipend. Legally, ASPC is registered as a 501(c)(3) non-profit organization. Its revenue comes primarily from mandatory student fees.

ASPC runs a number of committees, including the Pomona Events Committee (PEC), Pomona's student programming board.

Activities
ASPC has four main functions.

First, it distributes funding to student organizations at Pomona and the undergraduate Claremont Colleges (5Cs) totaling more than $500,000 annually. , its contributions make up 47% of funding for 5C student organizations.

Second, it advocates to the Pomona College administration on behalf of the student body. It has been characterized as an active participant in the college's shared governance.

Third, it provides various services to students, including an airport rideshare, a poster lab, and a New York Times distribution program. ASPC also runs the Coop Store (which sells food, apparel, and other sundries) and the Coop Fountain (a cafe).

Last, it conducts programming (largely through PEC), including covering the cost of security and alcohol for some social events.

Presidents

References

External links

Pomona College
Student governments in the United States
1904 establishments in California